Hieronymus Heyerdahl may refer to:

Hieronymus Heyerdahl (1773–1847)
Hieronymus Heyerdahl (1867–1959)